An Jae-hyun (born 25 December 1999) is a South Korean table tennis player.

Career 
He won a bronze medal at the 2019 World Table Tennis Championships.

2021 
An Jaehyun failed to qualify for the 2021 Tokyo Olympics despite tying for the best overall record at the Korean Olympic trials and going undefeated against top seed Jeoung Young-sik and second seed and eventual trial winner Lee Sang-su.

An Jae-hyun lost in the round of 16 to Hugo Calderano at the WTT Contender event in World Table Tennis' inaugural event WTT Doha. Despite only being ranked 39, An was able to avenge his World Championship semi-final loss to world ranked #8 Mattias Falck with a 3–0 win in the round of 32.

References

External links

South Korean male table tennis players
1999 births
Living people
World Table Tennis Championships medalists
Sportspeople from Daejeon
21st-century South Korean people